Nikolay Vasilyevich Belov (December 14, 1891 – March 6, 1982) was a Soviet and Russian crystallographer, geochemist, academician (1953), and Hero of Socialist Labour (1969).

Honours and awards
 Hero of Socialist Labour (1969)
 Four Orders of Lenin (1961, 1969, 1971, 1981)
 Order of the October Revolution (1975)
 Order of the Red Banner of Labour (1953)
 Medal "For the Defence of Moscow" (1944)
 Medal "For Valiant Labour in the Great Patriotic War 1941–1945" (1946)
 Medal "In Commemoration of the 800th Anniversary of Moscow" (1948)
 Medal "For Labour Valour" (1967)
 Jubilee Medal "In Commemoration of the 100th Anniversary of the Birth of Vladimir Ilyich Lenin" (1970)
 Stalin Prize, 1st class (1952)
 Lenin Prize (1974)
 First Prize Fedorov (USSR, 1948)
 Lomonosov Gold Medal (1965)
 Gold Medal Exhibition of Economic Achievements of the USSR (1962)
 Medal K. Ohridski (Sofia University K. Ohridski, Bulgaria, 1971)
 Honorary member of the All-Union Mineralogical Society (1964)
 First chairman of the National Committee of Soviet crystallographers (1955-1982)
 Member of the Board (1954), Vice-President (1957-1963), president (1966-1969) of the International Union of Crystallography
 Foreign member of the Polish Academy of Sciences (1978)
 Honorary Doctor of University of Wrocław B. Bierut (Poland, 1975)
 Honorary member of the Mineralogical Society USA (1960), England, Society of Mineralogy and Crystallography, France (1969), Geological Society of the GDR (1975), American Society of crystallographic (1969)

References

1891 births
1982 deaths
Academic staff of the D. Mendeleev University of Chemical Technology of Russia
Full Members of the USSR Academy of Sciences
Heroes of Socialist Labour
Stalin Prize winners
Lenin Prize winners
Recipients of the Lomonosov Gold Medal
Recipients of the Order of Lenin

Recipients of the Order of the Red Banner of Labour
Russian geochemists
Soviet geochemists
Burials at Kuntsevo Cemetery
Presidents of the International Union of Crystallography